Anacostia is a soap opera web series that premiered on October 15, 2009 on YouTube. It was created by Anthony A. Anderson (not to be confused with the actor of the same name), who also stars in, writes, produces, and directs the series. Anacostia chronicles the drama among residents of the titular community in Washington, D. C. Guest star Martha Byrne later became an executive producer on the series.

The series was nominated for a 2022 Primetime Emmy Award for Outstanding Actor In A Short Form Comedy or Drama Series (Anthony Anderson). Anthony Anderson became the first actor in history to be nominated for both a Daytime and Primetime Emmy for the same role.

The series was also nominated for a 2015 Daytime Emmy Award for Outstanding New Approaches Drama Series, and Martha Byrne won a Daytime Emmy the same year for Outstanding Performer in a New Approaches Drama Series for her performance as Alexis Jordan. Elizabeth Hubbard was nominated in 2016 for a Daytime Emmy Award for Outstanding Actress in a Digital Daytime Drama Series for her role as Eva Montgomery, and Anthony Anderson made history becoming the first African American to be nominated in 2017 for a Daytime Emmy Award for Outstanding Lead Actor in a Digital Daytime Drama Series for his role as Sean Williams-Grey. In 2017, actress Jennifer Bassey received the show's fifth nomination, in the Outstanding Guest Performer digital category. Anacostia has the most wins at the Indie Series Awards.

In 2018, Anacostia was picked up by Amazon Video for a multi year run on the streaming platform.

Cast

 Anthony Anderson as Sean (2009–present)
 William Lash as Scott (2009–present)
 Tamieka Chavis as Mia (2009–present)
 Marion Akpan as Nancy (2009–present)
 Pasha Diallo as Dominique (2009–present)
 Kena Hodges as Nicole (2009–present)
 Christopher Bair as Cliff (2009–present)
 Antonio Harrison, Jr. as Que (2010–present)
 Kelvin Terrell as Ray (2011–present)
 Martha Byrne as Alexis Jordan/JoAnne Edwards (2011–present)
 India Doy as Jennifer (2011–present)
 Tandrea Parrott as Desiree' (2010–present)
 Rolfini Whidbee as Maurice (2011–present)
 Luis Valdez as Eric (2012–present)
 Alexis Robinson Smith as Melissa (2014–present)
 Tremayne Norris as Carlos (2014–present)
 Melan Perez as Salina (2014–present)
 Elizabeth Hubbard as Eva Montgomery (2015–present)
 Jennifer Bassey as Beverley Newman (2017–present)
 Lauren B. Martin as Chevonne (2018–present)
 Walter Maxfield Jones as Michael (2009–present)
 Chanté Bowser as Salina (2009–2012)
 Jermaine McNeal as Andrew (2009–2011)
 Kareem Petteway as Creeko (2009)
 Rabon Hutcherson as Andre (2009–)
 Deidra Taylor as Lashawn ("Cherry") (2011–2013)
 Darnell Lamont Walker as Julian (season 2–3) 
 Carey Green as Jack (2010–present)
 Giselle Gant as Madison (2011–2013)
 Darnerien McCants as Cyrus (2011–2016)
 Tye Frazier as Brian (2011–2012)
 Tiana Harris as Ashley (2011–2012)
 Yohance Fleming as Chauncey (2011)
 Ashleigh McGill as April (2014)
 Dai Boggan as Tim (2015)
 Chris Deloatch as Clay (2015)
 Lauren Dorsey as Donatella
Devin Nikki Thomas as Tracee James (2017–Present)

Series overview

Episodes

Production
 
Anacostia was created in 2009 by Anderson, who also writes, executive produces and stars in the series. Byrne serves as executive producer. Lora Lee, Jamie Misiak and Alexis Robinson Smith are among the series' line producers. Marion Akpan, Christopher Bair, Pasha Diallo, India Doy-Young, Antonio Harrison Jr., Kena Hodges, William Lash, Rolfini Whidbee, and Spencer Bruttig serve as producers. Previous producers include Fritz Brekeller, the seasons 1-5 supervising producer, Tommy Zamberlan, as the seasons 1-5 Senior Producer, and Benjamin Bryant as co-executive producer of seasons 1-5.

Byrne, known for her longtime role on the defunct CBS soap opera As the World Turns, joined the series in the role of high-powered madame Alexis Jordan in 2011. In September 2015, Soap Opera Digest reported that Byrne's former As the World Turns co-star Elizabeth Hubbard would also appear on Anacostia as Eva Montgomery, in scenes directed and co-written by Byrne.

In early 2021, after an 18 month production hiatus, Spencer Bruttig was added to the team as the show's Cinematographer and producer.

The show has been photographed using RED, Sony and Blackmagic cinema cameras.

Over the series' successive seasons, Anderson has attempted to address a number of social issues through the series soap operatic lens, including realistic takes on mental illness, incest, male-male rape, and the real-life gentrification of the iconic D.C. neighborhood.

Awards and recognition
Anacostia was nominated for a 2022 Primetime Emmy Award for Outstanding Actor In A Short Form Comedy or Drama Series (Anthony Anderson).

Anacostia was also nominated for a 2015 Daytime Emmy Award for Outstanding New Approaches Drama Series, and Martha Byrne won a Daytime Emmy the same year for Outstanding Performer in a New Approaches Drama Series for her performance as Alexis Jordan. Elizabeth Hubbard was nominated in 2016 for a Daytime Emmy Award for Outstanding Actress in a Digital Daytime Drama Series for her role as Eva Montgomery. In 2017, Anthony Anderson was nominated for a Daytime Emmy Award for Outstanding Lead Actor in a Digital Daytime Drama Series for his role as Sean Williams-Grey. Jennifer Bassey was nominated in 2018 for Outstanding Guest Performer in a Digital Daytime Drama Series for her portrayal of Beverly Newman.

To date, the series has won fourteen Indie Series Awards, and has been nominated for several more. Anthony Anderson holds the record for most Acting Nominations (18) and is also the leader for overall Nominations (26) at the Indie Series Awards.

In December 2010, Anderson was named by We Love Soaps as one of the 15 Most Fascinating People of 2010.

In 2017, Gothamist Washington D.C. affiliate DCist named Anacostia "one of the best," in an article highlighting series set in the Washington D.C. area.

Gallery

References

External links
 
 
 
 
 
 
 
 

2009 web series debuts
2000s American drama television series
2010s American drama television series
African-American television
English-language television shows
2000s American LGBT-related drama television series
American drama web series
Internet soap operas
American LGBT-related web series
Television shows set in Washington, D.C.
2000s YouTube series
2010s American LGBT-related drama television series
2010s YouTube series